Haidar Haidar (born 1936 in Husayn al-Baher) is a Syrian writer and novelist.

His novel Walimah li A'ashab al-Bahr was banned in several Arab countries, and even resulted in a belated angry reaction from the clerics of Al-Azhar University upon reprinting in Egypt in the year 2000. The clerics issued a Fatwa banning the novel, and accused Haidar of heresy and offending Islam. Al-Azhar University students staged huge protests against the novel, that eventually led to its confiscation.

Works

Novels 
 Al-Fahd, 1968
 Az-Zaman al-Muhish, 1973
 Walimah li A'ashab al-Bahr 1983
 Maraya an-Nar, 1992
 Shumous al-Ghajar, 1996
 Haql Urjuwan, 2000
 Marathi al-Ayyam, 2001

Short stories 
 Hakaya an-Nawrass al-Muhajir, 1968 
 Al-Wamdh, 1970
 Al-Faiadhan, 1975
 Al-Wu'ul, 1978
 At-Tamawujat, 1982 
 Ghasaq al-Aalihah, 1994

Other works 
 Capucci, 1978
 Awraq al-Manfa, 1993
 Olumona

References

Haidar Haidar’s ‘Banquet for Seaweed’ Attempts Balancing Act.  MAHMOUD SAEED. Al Jadid, Vol. 6, no. 31 (Spring 2000)

Living people
Syrian novelists
1936 births
Syrian Alawites 
People from Tartus